Laze (also Reuther or Laase) is a settlement south of Novo Mesto in southeastern Slovenia. The railway line from Ljubljana to Metlika runs through the settlement. The area is part of the traditional region of Lower Carniola and is now included in the Southeast Slovenia Statistical Region.

The local church, built on the southern outskirts of the village, is dedicated to Saint Matthias and belongs to the Parish of Toplice. It dates to the late 17th century.

References

External links
Laze on Geopedia
Pre–World War II map of Laze with oeconyms and family names

Populated places in the City Municipality of Novo Mesto